ONE 159: de Ridder vs. Bigdash was a Combat sport event produced by ONE Championship that took place on July 22, 2022, at the Singapore Indoor Stadium in Kallang, Singapore.

Background
A ONE Middleweight World Championship bout between the champion Reinier de Ridder and former champion Vitaly Bigdash headlined the event.

An interim ONE Women's Atomweight Muay Thai World Championship bout between the ONE Kickboxing Atomweight World champion Janet Todd and Lara Fernandez was booked as the co-main event.

Fight card update

A Lightweight Muay Thai bout between Sinsamut Klinmee and former ONE Lightweight Kickboxing Championship challenger Islam Murtazaev was expected to take place at the event. However, Murtazaev withdraw due to a family emergency and was replaced by Liam Nolan.

A Women's Atomweight Submission grappling rematch between 2018 Asian Games gold medalist in Jujitsu and 2019 Southeast Asian Games gold medalist in Jujitsu Jessa Khan and Amanda Alequin was scheduled to take place at the event. However, Alequin withdraw due to undisclosed medical issue.

A Heavyweight bout between Anderson Silva and Mikhail Jamal Abdul-Latif was scheduled to take place at the event. However, Abdul-Latif withdrawal due to suffered an injury.

Results

Bonus awards 
The following fighters received $50,000 bonuses.

Performance of the Night: Reinier de Ridder, Danial Williams and Sinsamut Klinmee

See also 

 2022 in ONE Championship
 List of ONE Championship events
 List of current ONE fighters

References 

Events in Singapore
ONE Championship events
2022 in mixed martial arts
Mixed martial arts in Singapore
Sports competitions in Singapore
July 2022 sports events in Singapore